La Música No Se Toca Tour is a concert tour by Spanish singer Alejandro Sanz as promoting his album La Música No Se Toca. In order to start promoting the album the artist made special presentations in Miami (Olympia Theater and Office Building), New York and Puerto Rico, and then officially start the tour in Mexico.

History

The tour officially began in Mexico for the following cities: Puebla, Mexico City, Cancun, Mérida, Monterrey, Guadalajara, Tijuana and San Luis Potosí for a total of 10 concerts. Sanz subsequently performed a private concert at the House of Blues in Los Angeles, United States. In November, he traveled to Spain specifically to Barcelona for three concerts at the Palau de la Música Catalana. Return to Miami to close their presentations with a concert unprecedented broadcast to 17 countries through the Terra.com.

Starts 2013 with his Latin American tour in nine countries (Colombia, Peru, Uruguay, Argentina, Chile, Brazil, Ecuador, Panama and Costa Rica) for a total of 19 concerts. After he travels to United States for concerts in Los Angeles, New York, Washington and Miami. Then close this leg of the tour with a show in Puerto Rico.

In May began his triumphal tour for Spain where he visited Barcelona, Bilbao, Murcia, Alicante, Valencia, Zaragoza, La Coruna, Sevilla, Granada, Malaga, Madrid, Valladolid, Mallorca, Cordoba, Cadiz, Almeria, Ontinyent, Perelada, San Carlos de la Rapita and Marbella; for a total of 22 concerts. After a short break, back to Mexico to make 16 presentations over the following locations: Mexico City, Guadalajara, Monterrey, Durango, Leon, Aguascalientes, Villahermosa, Querétaro y Puebla.

During the 2014 he presented a recital in Veracruz, Mexico and another in Punta Cana, Dominican Republic. Then participate during the month of August to the "Starlite Festival" in Marbella, Spain.

Setlist

Tour dates

 The concert on October 12, 2012 in Foro Sol of Mexico City was broadcast on February 2, 2013 by the Channel of the Stars of Televisa.
 The concert on December 6, 2012 in Bamboo Night Club Miami was broadcast to 17 countries through of Terra.com.
 The concert on March 9, 2013 in Estadio GEBA of Buenos Aires was broadcast on Channel QMusica
 The concert on June 19, 2013 in Estadio de La Cartuja of Sevilla was recorded for the CD / DVD, "La Música No Se Toca En Vivo".

Box office score data (Billboard)

Personnel
 Mike Ciro – Musical Director and Guitar
 Alfonso Pérez – Piano, Vocal and Guitar
 Chris Hierro – Keyboards and Vocal
 Nathaniel Townsley – Drums
 Carlos Martín – Percussion, Wind and Keyboards
 Bri (Brigitte) Sosa – Bass and Vocal
 Brittany Denaro – Guitar
 Julie Mendez – Wind, Vocal and Percussion
 Sara Devine / Katia Díaz / Jackie Mendez – Vocals

References

External links
 Web Oficial Alejandro Sanz.

2012 concert tours
2013 concert tours
2014 concert tours
Alejandro Sanz